High School Musical: Sing It! is a video game for the Wii and  PlayStation 2 based on the High School Musical franchise.

The game features the songs from the first High School Musical and its 2007 sequel, High School Musical 2. It also features a selection of songs from Disney Channel artists and a "Story mode" where the players can follow the story of the first movie through Kelsi's perspective.

The characters of Troy, Gabriella, Chad, Taylor, Ryan, and Sharpay are available to the player, alongside an option to create their own character. The visuals of the game are animated and based on motion capture.

It's the first game in the Disney Sing It series and was followed by the self-titled game.

Songs
Start of Something New
Get'cha Head in the Game
What I've Been Looking For (Sharpay and Ryan version)
What I've Been Looking For (Troy and Gabriella version)
Stick to the Status Quo
When There Was Me and You
Bop to the Top
Breaking Free
We're All in This Together
I Can't Take My Eyes Off of You
What Time Is It?
Fabulous
Work This Out
You Are the Music in Me
I Don't Dance
You Are the Music in Me (Sharpay Version)
Gotta Go My Own Way
Bet On It
Everyday **
All for One
Humuhumunukunukuapua'a
All Good Now *
Beautiful Soul *
Cheetah Sisters *
Counting on You *
I Will Be Around *
Jump to the Rhythm *
No One*
On The Ride*
Push It to the Limit *

 Bonus Song. This song was not in any of the High School Musical movies.
 Original movie soundtrack recording of this song.

Stages
 Auditorium
 Cafeteria
 Corridors
 Golf Course
 Gym
 New Year's Eve Lodge
 Rooftop Garden
 School Grounds
 Science Class
 Summer Resort
 Swimming Pool
 Trophy Room

Reception

Reviews for the game are mostly mixed, as GameRankings gave it a score of 55.75% for the PlayStation 2 version and 59.67% for the Wii version, while Metacritic gave it a score of 56 out of 100 for the PlayStation 2 version and 64 out of 100 for the Wii version.

The PlayStation 2 version of Sing It! received a "Platinum" sales award from the Entertainment and Leisure Software Publishers Association (ELSPA), indicating sales of at least 300,000 copies in the United Kingdom.

See also
Disney Sing It
Disney Sing It! – High School Musical 3: Senior Year
Disney Sing It: Pop Hits
Disney Sing It: Party Hits
Disney Sing It: Family Hits

References

External links
 Official site 1
 Official site 2
 GameSpot page
 Information on the game
 

PlayStation 2 games
Wii games
2007 video games
Sing It!
Karaoke video games
Behaviour Interactive games
Video games developed in Canada